Stronchreggan  is a scattered coastal hamlet, on the north eastern shores of Loch Linnhe, and is  situated directly across from Fort William in Lochaber, Scottish Highlands and is in the council area of Highland.

The hamlet of Trislaig is 1 mile northeast along the coastal road.

Populated places in Lochaber